Chogye International Zen Center is a Kwan Um School of Zen practice center founded by Seung Sahn in 1975, located in New York City. The center offers a daily practice regimen, as well as retreats and workshops. Wu Kwang is the guiding teacher and resident Zen Master, the abbot is Steven Cohen.

See also
 Cambridge Zen Center
 List of Zen centers in the United States
 Musangsa
 Providence Zen Center
 Tel Aviv Zen Center
 Timeline of Zen Buddhism in the United States

External links
Chogye International Zen Center
Kwan Um School of Zen

References

Buddhist temples in New York City
Zen centers in New York (state)
Kwan Um School of Zen